Swimming Pool (also known as Swimming Pool - Der Tod feiert mit in Germany, and The Pool in the US and UK) is a 2001 German slasher film directed by  Boris von Sychowski and starring Kristen Miller, Elena Uhlig, Thorsten Grasshoff, John Hopkins, Isla Fisher, and James McAvoy. It follows a group of students at an elite international school in Prague who break into an indoor water park where they are stalked by a  masked murderer.

Plot

Catherine is waiting for her boyfriend to arrive at her home, where she is cooking dinner. She discovers her boyfriend's car in her driveway, and inside finds him with his throat slit. A killer wearing a skull mask breaks into the home and murders her, throwing her body in a swimming pool.

Shortly after, a group of international students from an elite Prague school are graduating; among them are the American Sarah; the Scottish Mike; the English Frank; Kim, an Australian; Carmen, from Germany; Diego, from Argentina; and others. To celebrate, Sarah's boyfriend Greg plans to break into an indoor swimming complex with the help of Martin, an American former student and employee of the water park, giving the friends free access to pools and water slides. On finals day, Kim is upset over failing her tests. She and Mike, her boyfriend, go swimming at a lake, and she tells him she feels like an outcast among him and his wealthy peers; she decides not to attend the party. Later, Kim is accosted in the woods by the masked killer, and stabbed to death with a machete.

Late that night, the group arrive at the water park and are let inside by Martin, where they begin drinking and swimming in the pools. Svenja and Carter go to an isolated pool to ride a water slide. While Carter waits for her at the bottom, he is stabbed to death. As Svenja descends the waterslide, the killer drives a machete through the bottom of the slide; she attempts to stop but is unable to, and the machete slices through her groin. Shortly after, Carmen and Chris discover their bodies floating in the small pool. Carmen and Chris locate the remainder of the group, but they find they are unable to leave the building as the entryways have been locked. Meanwhile, Martin and Mel find an empty weight room to have sex. When Martin goes to retrieve a condom, Mel is attacked by the killer chased into a locker room where she is killed.

Aware that a killer is loose, Sarah, Mike, Carmen, and Chris intercept Martin en route back to the weight room. In a panic, they rush to save Mel, but find her corpse in a bathroom stall. The group are unable to locate Greg, Frank, or Diego, and Martin finds that the lock picks and spare keys to the building have been removed; the phones have also been disconnected. Martin recalls an air duct leading out of the building, and proposes the group exit that way. He goes ahead to dismantle a vent grate, after which Sarah, Mike, and Carmen follow; Chris stays behind, as they are unable to turn around and lift him from inside the duct. As they crawl through the duct, the killer begins driving his machete through the bottom of it, killing Mike and Martin.

Sarah and Carmen escape through a separate duct and find themselves in the basement, where they are confronted by the killer, who chases them through the building. They momentarily hide in a security monitor room and ponder who the killer is; Carmen believes it is Greg. Meanwhile, Diego and Greg find Chris, terrified. Greg decides to enter the air duct to find a way out, and Diego waits with Chris. Greg finds Sarah and Carmen in a room overlooking the pool. Convinced he is the killer, Carmen knocks him unconscious, and she and Sarah lock him inside. Carmen attempts to swim into a filter chamber to exit the building. She injures her leg in the process, but is able to access the exterior of the building. Outside, she finds a security guard's corpse with a gun lying next to it, but before she can retrieve it, she is stabbed by the killer and thrown back into the filter chamber.

Inside, Sarah is confronted by Frank, who reveals himself to be the killer, motivated out of spite and jealousy over his failed romantic advances on each of the women. Sarah manages to douse him with vodka and light him on fire, but he leaps into the pool. Greg breaks free of the room overlooking the pool, jumping into the pool below, and the men begin to fight. Sarah enters the water and manages to stab Frank with a broken bottle. He rises from the water while Greg and Sarah attempt to flee, but is shot to death by Carmen, who survived the earlier attack.

Cast

Reception
, Swimming Pool holds a 36% approval rating on Rotten Tomatoes, based on eleven reviews with an average rating of 5.15/10. Film critic Jim Harper wrote: "With the basic material so derivative and stereotyped, The Pool wasn't going to be a classic, but might have lifted itself above the average. Sadly it's also stuck with some atrocious performances and a dumb script."

See also
Spree killer

References

Works cited

External links

German slasher films
2001 horror films
2001 films
2000s slasher films
Films shot in the Czech Republic
Films set in Prague
English-language German films
2000s English-language films
2000s German films